Bartholomäus is a masculine German given name, the German equivalent of Bartholomew. Notable people with this name include:

 Bartholomäus Aich, 17th century South-German organist and composer
 Bartholomäus Bernhardi of Feldkirchen (1487-1551), rector and a professor of physics and philosophy at the University of Wittenberg
 Bartholomäus Brötzner (born 1957), Austrian wrestler
 Bartholomäus Gesius (c. 1562–1613), German theologian, church musician, composer and hymn writer
 Bartholomäus Herder (1774–1839), founder of the publishing firm Verlag Herder
 Bartholomäus Hopfer (1628–1699), German painter
 Bartholomäus Kalb (born 1949), German politician
 Bartholomäus Keckermann (c. 1572–1608), German writer, Calvinist theologian and philosopher
 Bartholomäus Khöll (1614–1664), imperial master stonemason
 Bartholomäus Kilian (1630–1696), German engraver
 Bartholomäus Metlinger (15th century), German physician
 Bartholomäus Ringwaldt (1532–1599), German didactic poet and Lutheran pastor
 Bartholomäus Sastrow (1520–1603), German official, notary, and mayor of Stralsund
 Bartholomäus Scultetus (1540–1614), mayor of Görlitz, astronomer, cartographer and compiler
 Bartholomäus Zeitblom (c. 1450 – c. 1519), German painter, the chief master of the school of Ulm
 Bartholomäus Ziegenbalg (1682–1719), member of the Lutheran clergy and the first Pietist missionary to India
 Bartholomäus van der Lake (died 1468), German clergyman and author of a chronicle of the city of Soest
 Bartholomäus von Stürmer (1787–1863), Austrian diplomat
 Christoph Bartholomäus Anton Migazzi (1714–1803), Prince-Archbishop of Vienna
 Johann Heinrich Bartholomäus Walter (1734–1802), Baltic German architect

See also

References